Katha conformis is a moth of the family Erebidae. It is found in India, Thailand and China (Shanxi, Zhejiang, Fujian, Jiangxi, Hunan, Guangxi, Sichuan, Guizhou, Hubei, Yunnan and Guangdong).

References

Moths described in 1854
Lithosiina